Debbie Bestwick  (born 7 March 1970) is a British entrepreneur. Following a short career in video game retail, she was part of the December 1990 merger between British video game publisher 17-Bit Software and Swedish developer Team 7 that led to the formation of Team17, where she acts as chief executive officer. Bestwick was awarded various accolades related to the video game industry between 2015 and 2017, and was pronounced a Member of the Most Excellent Order of the British Empire in June 2016 for her services in that industry.

Career 
Debbie Bestwick was born on 7 March 1970. She attended Holgate School in Hucknall. Bestwick gained a significant interest in video games at the age of twelve, when she played Football Manager on her brother's ZX Spectrum. As she approached her A-level examinations aged sixteen, Bestwick sought for a job to fund her summer vacation, and eventually found two open positions in Nottingham that caught her interest, one at a grocery store and one at a video game store, of which she chose to apply for the latter. Bestwick described the idea of working with video games as "heaven". She never returned to finish her exams. A short time into her part-time job, the store's owner stepped down and offered Bestwick to take over the business, to which she agreed. Subsequently, Bestwick managed the store for twelve months before negotiating its sale to entrepreneur Michael Robinson and its integration into Microbyte, Robinson's UK-wide computer retail chain headquartered in Wakefield. At Microbyte, Bestwick was promoted time and time again, eventually becoming promotions manager and later sales manager.

In 1990, co-worker Martyn Brown conceived the idea of converting 17-Bit Software, a video game publisher also owned by Robinson, into a venture that acted as both publisher and developer, using a Swedish three-man team from Olofström, Sweden, known as Team 7, as internal developers and Brown as project manager. Team 7 was previously formed the same year through interaction between Brown and Swedish programmer Andreas Tadic, and at the time consisted of Tadic, Rico Holmes and Peter Tuleby. After Robinson agreed, Brown became, as intended, project manager, while Bestwick was given the role of "commercial support" for 17-Bit Software. The two studios soon agreed to formally merge and created Team17 on 7 December 1990. Day-to-day business was run by Bestwick and Brown, however, following her management buyout of both Brown and Robinson in 2010, Bestwick became the sole manager of Team17 as chief executive officer.

Personal life 
Bestwick is single with two children and resides in the countryside north of Nottingham.

Accolades 
In April 2015, at the 2015 MCV Awards, video game magazine MCV named Bestwick "Person of the Year". At the first Women in Games conference in September 2015, also organised by MCV, Bestwick was honoured with the "Hall of Fame" award. At the second iteration of that conference, held in May 2016, Bestwick won the "Businesswoman of the Year" award. At the 2016 Birthday Honours Bestwick was pronounced a Member of the Most Excellent Order of the British Empire (MBE) for her services in the video game industry. At the 2017 Golden Joystick Awards, Bestwick was awarded in the category for "Outstanding Contribution to the UK Games Industry".

Controversy 
Eurogamer reported in February 2022 that Team17 employees held mixed feelings towards Bestwick. Some staffers stated that she caused a presenteeism culture at the company and frequently passed down pressure from external partners or a falling share price to employees and caused individual persons to leave meetings in tears. One employee said that she ignored harassment.

References 

1970 births
British chief executives
Living people
Members of the Order of the British Empire
Team17
Video game businesspeople
Women in the video game industry